Mazer Cup  or The Mazer Cup International Mead Competition, has been described as "the largest commercial and amateur mead competition in the world", as it is composed of two events  - one for commercial companies and one for amateur brewers.  

It is the largest mead event in the U.S., drawing hundreds of entries which are judged by scores of accredited judges, mead authors and celebrities, meadery owners, and accomplished meadmakers. As of 2021 it is widely considered to be the most prestigious mead award because the field of competition is so large.  Entries come from every state and from many foreign countries. The current president (2021) is Pete Bakulić.

See also
Mazer (drinking vessel)
Mead in the United States

References

External links
Homepage

Mead
Food and drink awards
Competitions in the United States